John Walker (18 January 1883 – 22 March 1966) was a British gymnast. He competed in the men's team all-around event at the 1920 Summer Olympics.

References

1883 births
1966 deaths
British male artistic gymnasts
Olympic gymnasts of Great Britain
Gymnasts at the 1920 Summer Olympics
Sportspeople from Walsall